The 2000 French motorcycle Grand Prix was the fifth round of the 2000 Grand Prix motorcycle racing season. It took place on 14 May 2000 at the Bugatti Circuit in Le Mans.

500 cc classification

250 cc classification

125 cc classification

Championship standings after the race (500cc)

Below are the standings for the top five riders and constructors after round five has concluded. 

Riders' Championship standings

Constructors' Championship standings

 Note: Only the top five positions are included for both sets of standings.

References

French motorcycle Grand Prix
French
Motorcycle Grand Prix